Everton Park may refer to:

Everton Park, Queensland, Australia – a suburb of Brisbane
Everton Park, Liverpool, England – a park
Everton Park, Singapore, Singapore – a subzone of Bukit Merah
Everton Stadium, future home ground of Everton Football Club
Goodison Park, current home ground of Everton Football Club